Williamsburg Inn is a historic large resort hotel located at Williamsburg, Virginia. It was built in three phases between 1937 and 1972.  The original section was designed by Perry Dean Rogers Architects and is dominated by a two-story portico which stands atop a ground floor arcade. It is a three-story, seven-bay, Colonial Revival style brick structure.  It has two-story flanking wings in an "H"-shape.  The East Wing addition, also by Perry Dean Rogers Architects, consists of multiple wings of guest rooms set at right angles to one another. A third phase embracing the Regency Dining Room and its adjoining courtyard, was completed in 1972.  The Williamsburg Inn is one of the nation's finest resort hotels, internationally acclaimed for its accommodations, service and cuisine.  It represented John D. Rockefeller, Jr.'s commitment to bring the message of Williamsburg to a larger audience of influential Americans.

It was listed on the National Register of Historic Places in 1997. Williamsburg Inn is a member of Historic Hotels of America, the official program of the National Trust for Historic Preservation.

The Williamsburg Inn has also twice hosted Queen Elizabeth II and her husband Prince Philip, Duke of Edinburgh, in 1957 and 2007 whilst visiting Jamestown, Virginia. These visits marked the original settlement of the British colonists on the 350th and 400th anniversaries when the British first landed in America. This was in conjunction, with their official state visits of the United States which furthermore did not begin officially until the Queen and the President met formally at the White House.

See also
 List of Historic Hotels of America

References

External links
Williamsburg Inn website

Hotel buildings on the National Register of Historic Places in Virginia
Hotel buildings completed in 1937
Colonial Revival architecture in Virginia
Buildings and structures in Williamsburg, Virginia
National Register of Historic Places in Williamsburg, Virginia
1937 establishments in Virginia
Historic Hotels of America